is a Japanese football referee currently officiating in the J. League. Yoshida was suspended at international level by the Asian Football Confederation for a controversial decision made during a 2006 FIFA World Cup qualification match between Bahrain and Uzbekistan in which Uzbekistan should have retaken a penalty for encroachment but instead awarded a free-kick to Bahrain.

References

Living people
1963 births
Japanese football referees